Standings and results for Group 6 of the UEFA Euro 2004 qualifying tournament.

Group 6 consisted of Armenia, Greece, Northern Ireland, Spain and Ukraine. Group winners were Greece, who unexpectedly finished one point clear of second-placed team Spain who qualified for the play-offs.

Standings

Matches

Goalscorers

References
UEFA Page
RSSSF Page

Group 6
2002–03 in Ukrainian football
2003–04 in Ukrainian football
2002–03 in Northern Ireland association football
2003–04 in Northern Ireland association football
2002–03 in Spanish football
Qual
2002–03 in Greek football
2003–04 in Greek football
Greece at UEFA Euro 2004
2002 in Armenian football
2003 in Armenian football